Charles Heber Clark (July 11, 1841 – August 10, 1915) was an American novelist and humorist. Most of his work was written under the pen name Max Adeler. Clark was also known by the pseudonym, John Quill.

Biography
Clark was born in Berlin, Maryland, the son of William J. Clark, an Episcopal clergyman whose abolitionist sympathies made short his stay in Southern parishes. Charles was educated at a school in Georgetown, D.C., and at the age of fifteen became an office boy in a Philadelphia commission house.  During the American Civil War, he enlisted in the Union Army, and was discharged two years later at the close of the war.  He then became a reporter for The Philadelphia Inquirer, and within two months was promoted to editorial writer. Later he was dramatic and music critic of the Philadelphia Evening Bulletin, and an editorial writer on the North American. His was interested in economics, and he was a strong advocate of a high tariff.  The bias led him to become editor and proprietor of the Textile Record, a founder and secretary of the Manufacturers' Club, and editor of its organ, the Manufacturer.  Clark was also on the board of directors of the Johnson and Johnson medical supply company. He became independently wealthy through investments and retired from editorial work to his suburban home at Conshohocken, Pa.  He was twice married, his first wife having been Clara Lukens; she died in 1895 and two years later he married Elizabeth Killé Clark, a "distant cousin." Clark was the sister of Walter Leighton Clark, an industrialist and founder of the Grand Central Art Galleries.

Nearly all of Clark's writing was published under the pseudonym of "Max Adeler". His best known work was Out of the Hurly Burly, extremely popular in its time and almost forgotten today. Its boisterous, extravagant humor made Clark's work highly popular in England for many years, and some of his work was initially published there.  "Out of the Hurly Burly" was the first book illustrated by comics pioneer A. B. Frost, who would also illustrate other books by Clark. Some of the pieces in Clark/Adeler's books hold up quite well today.

A subject of much contention was Clark's claim that Mark Twain plagiarized his 1880 novelette "Fortunate Island" with A Connecticut Yankee in King Arthur's Court, published in 1889. In Clark's work, a technically proficient American is shipwrecked on an island that broke off from Britain during Arthurian times, and never developed any further, while Twain's book takes a technically proficient American back to the Arthurian times themselves. Twain actually wrote what he considered a rebuttal to the charge, only he compared "Yankee" to Clark's story "An Old Fogey" which also appeared in the same volume as "Fortunate Island." Additionally, Twain and Clark had a long running feud dating back to the early 1870s, where each writer accused the other of plagiarism. One piece by Twain attacking Clark (as "John Quill" but not actually named) appeared in Galaxy Magazine in 1870, entitled "A Literary Old Offender in Court with Suspicious Property in His Possession".

Clark hated his own reputation as a humorist in later years and gave up humor for a while. He returned to it in the early years of the twentieth century, writing light pieces for magazines, and a few nostalgia-laced romances. He died in Eagles Mere, Pennsylvania in 1915.

Partial bibliography
Out of the Hurly Burly; or, Life in an Odd Corner (1874)
"Elbow-Room; A Novel Without a Plot" (1876)
"Random Shots" (London - 1878)
"An Old Fogey and Other Stories" (London - 1881) 
"The Fortunate Island and Other Stories" (US edition of "An Old Fogey and Other Stories) (1882)
"Captain Bluitt, A tale of Old Turly" (1901)
"The Quakeress, a Tale" (1905)
"The Great Natural Healer" (1910)

References

American Authors 1964 (copyright 1938)
"Charles Heber Clark: A Family Memoir" by Charles Heber Clark, David Ketterer editor. (pub 1995)

External links

 
 
 
 
Out of The Hurly-Burly in various formats at Ex-Classics Web Site
 Over 70 Max Adeler Stories read on Mister Ron's Basement Podcast, now indexed to make them easy to find
The Secret of Max Adeler's Name
 Charles Heber Clark at Johnson and Johnson [Adeler and Clark not found here February 2019]

 

1841 births
1915 deaths
19th-century American novelists
American science fiction writers
20th-century American novelists
People from Berlin, Maryland
American male novelists
19th-century American male writers
20th-century American male writers